Pigeon Bay is a body of water that lies between Minnesota, United States and Ontario, Canada and is part of Lake Superior. The international boundary between the two countries lies in the middle of the bay.  The name of "Pigeon" Bay was most likely from the prevalence of the passenger pigeon which was common in the US/Canada border region.

Grand Portage State Park is on the Minnesota side of the bay, and Pigeon River is on the Ontario side of the bay.

References

External links

 Grand Portage State Park
 Pigeon River Provincial Park
Height of Land Portage at Google Maps

Border rivers
Canada–United States border
Rivers of Cook County, Minnesota
International rivers of North America
Rivers of Minnesota
Rivers of Thunder Bay District
Tributaries of Lake Superior